Jim's Big Ego is a Boston, Massachusetts-based band formed in 1995 under the leadership of singer/songwriter Jim Infantino, who was named as the best new artist of 1995 by the National Academy of Songwriters.

Among the band's songs are "The Ballad of Barry Allen," about the DC superhero Barry Allen/The Flash, a character co-created by Infantino's uncle Carmine Infantino; “Asshole”, a song about the George W. Bush administration that went viral, and "New Lang Syne" (sometimes also called "Thank God It's Over"), a new New Year's Eve song featured on National Public Radio's All Things Considered in 2001.

Discography
Strawman (1993)
The World of Particulars (1995)
Also see Jim's Big Ego

Members
Jim Infantino – guitar, lead vocals
Jesse Flack – double bass, vocals
Dan Cantor – drums, vocals
Josh Kantor – Keyboards, vocals

Discography
1996 – Titanic
1996 – More Songs About Me
1998 – Don't Get Smart
1999 – Y2K – Hooray! (EP)
2000 – Noplace Like Nowhere
2003 – They're Everywhere
2005 – Support the Truth (EP E-Album)
2008 – free*
2012 – Stay

External links

 
"New New Year Song" from NPR's All Things Considered December 31, 2001

Jim's Big Ego collection at the Internet Archive's live music archive
The Ego & The Oracle: Stage show featuring Jim's Big Ego in an experiment of "musical fortune-telling."

References 

Musical groups from Boston
Musical groups established in 1995